Aethes atmospila is a species of moth of the family Tortricidae. It is found in China (Xinjiang, Yunnan).

References

Moths described in 1937
argentilimitana
Moths of Asia